A hallmark is an official stamp of quality on a precious metal.

Hallmark may also refer to:

Companies and institutions
Hallmark Cards, a greeting card manufacturer based in Kansas City, Missouri
Hallmark Channel, an American cable television network owned by Crown Media Holdings, a privately owned subsidiary of Hallmark Cards
Hallmark Channel (International)
Hallmark Channel (Australia)
Hallmark Channel (Italy)
Hallmark Channel (UK)
Business Hallmark, a Nigerian newspaper
Hallmark Connections, a British coach operator
Hallmark Guitars, an American guitar manufacturer
Hallmark Institute of Photography, a for-profit school in Turners Falls, Massachusetts, open 1975–2016
Hallmark Records, a British record label
Sonar Entertainment, previously known as Hallmark Entertainment

People
Charlotte Hallmark, Cherokee American politician and chief
Roger Hallmark (1946–2014), American country singer-songwriter

Other uses
Hallmark, Louisville, a small neighborhood in western Louisville, Kentucky, USA
Hallmark-Sonali Bank Loan Scam, a corruption scandal in the Bangladesh

See also
The Hallmarks a Psychedelic Rock band of the 60s from New Jersey